John Tolkien may refer to:

J. R. R. Tolkien (1892–1973), author of The Lord of the Rings
John Tolkien (priest), J. R. R. Tolkien's son (1917–2003), priest